Eve is a British children's science fiction series starring Poppy Lee Friar that follows the adventures of a gynoid, a female android, named Eve (also known as Project Eternity) living with a family in suburbia, trying to make sense of human life as a teenage girl. Written by children's writer Emma Reeves, Eve was co-created with David Chikwe, creative director of Blacklisted Films.

Eve launched on CBBC on 5 January 2015 with its 13-episode first series occupying a Monday afternoon slot in the channel's schedule. This was later followed by special airing on Christmas Day 2015. A 12-episode second series followed in 2016. The third series was first confirmed by a post on Poppy Lee Friar's Instagram account and began airing on 19 October 2016 and concluded on 14 December 2016.

Cast

Main

Poppy Lee Friar as Eve, the main protagonist of the series. Eve is a newly-awakened gynoid whose appearance is based on Helen, the deceased twin sister of Eve’s “mother”, Mary Douglas, as she appeared during the 1970s. In public she assumes the guise of Will's cousin from the United States. Eve is socially inept and often unaware of the many dangers she often finds herself in, but with help from her adopted family she learns to pass for a human and decide her own course.
Oliver Woollford as Will Clarke, a teenage boy who awakened Eve and Dr. Clarke's son. He develops a strong relationship with Eve and holds a fierce desire to protect her, even at the cost of his own safety though his stubbornness often brings him into conflict with his family and friends.
Eubha Akilade as Lily Watson, a genius teenage girl and socially awkward hacker who is Will's best friend. She also forms a close friendship with Eve and despite occasional jealousy, is both fascinated by and protective of the often ignorant gynoid.
Elijah Ayité as Abe Watson, Lily's acquisitive little brother who  affectionately refers to Eve as "Robo Girl". Though a constant annoyance to Will and Lily and largely unaware or uninterested in ethics or empathy, he actually cares deeply for Eve and maintains a moral code.
Ben Cartwright as Dr. Nick Clarke
Rhona Croker as Dr. Katherine Calvin, the central antagonist of the first season; a brilliant but highly contemptuous and ambitious scientist and manager of Calimov Systems. She usually holds Nick and his family in little regard.
Jane Asher as Mary Douglas, the transhumanist main antagonist of the series and Eve's creator. She believes humans are good only for death and destruction and thus seeks to replace them with a species of artificial intelligence that will eventually shape the future of the entire universe.

Recurring

 Shonagh Price as Maddy Watson
Richie Campbell as Viv Watson
Jenny Bede as Rebecca Clarke
Ellie Grainger as KT
Alex Sawyer as Michael Hoffman
Michael Wildman as Lord Hoffman 
Peter Collins as Mr Gwenlan
Rory Barraclough as Chris
Paksie Vernon as Laurie
Chris Hegarty as Cain 
Billy Ashworth as Zac and Adam

Episodes

Awards and nominations

References

External links
 
 

Androids in television
2010s British children's television series
2015 British television series debuts
2016 British television series endings
BBC children's television shows
British children's drama television series
British children's science fiction television series
Fictional androids
Television series about teenagers
Transhumanism in television series